Murray City Council is the city council in Murray, Kentucky, USA.

It includes twelve councillors and the Mayor. As of September 2014, its mayor is Danny Hudspeth and its councillors are Jeremy Bell, Robert Billington, Linda Cherry, Mike Faihst, Pete Lancaster, Dan Miller, Jason Pittman, Pat Scott, F. T. Butch Seargent, Jane Shoemaker and Greg Taylor. They are due for re-election in December 2014

References

External links
http://murrayledger.com/news/city-council-hears-reports-from-agencies/article_81ff7966-3a33-11e4-b76e-0731ac3a78eb.html

Kentucky city councils
Murray, Kentucky